The Massachusetts Comprehensive Assessment system, commonly abbreviated as MCAS , is Massachusetts's statewide standards-based assessment program developed in 1993 in response to the Massachusetts Education Reform Act of the same year. State and federal law mandates that all students who are enrolled in the tested grades and who are educated with Massachusetts public funds participate in MCAS testing.

If necessary, students are given multiple opportunities to take the test to maximize the chance that said student will pass the exam.

Preparation 

Students are prepared for the exams throughout their academic careers through primary and secondary education. However, if an individual student needs help improving in a particular test, the first step in giving that student the extra help he or she needs is to identify specific weaknesses. Sometimes the student, teachers, or parents are aware of the weaknesses; sometimes they are not. Diagnostic tests may be administered to ascertain a student's strengths and weaknesses.

Grade levels
Students take different tests according to their grade level.  In addition to these tests, students may be required to take tryouts and pilot tests.  The following list is current as of spring 2017. It is required for a student to pass the English Language Arts, Mathematics and Science and Technology/Engineering portions of the Grade 10 test in order to meet the Competency Determination requirement.

Note: High School students take a Science and Technology/Engineering test in biology, chemistry, introductory physics, or technology/engineering.

Note: The History and Social Sciences test has been placed on hold due to budgetary concerns.

An Educational Proficiency Plan EPP must be developed for the subject matter area(s) in English Language Arts and mathematics in which students did not meet or exceed a scaled score of 240.

10th graders who score at the Advanced performance level on one of the three high school state assessment tests in ELA, Mathematics, or STE (Biology, Chemistry, Introductory Physics, or Technology/Engineering); and 
score at the Proficient level or higher on the remaining two high school state assessment tests; and 
have combined scores from the three tests that place them in the top 25 percent of students in the graduating class in their district are eligible for the John and Abigail Adams Scholarship. Recipients receive a tuition waiver (not including fees) to attend state colleges and universities in Massachusetts. The waiver is in effect for 6 years.

MCAS school and district level reports are released each fall on the Department of Elementary and Secondary Education website.

Criticism
The MCAS has been criticized for being too narrow in nature and for pressuring teachers into restricting the curriculum to material covered by the tests. It has been met with opposition from former mayor Scott W. Lang of New Bedford, who called it "completely unsustainable" and "impractical". He claimed that the MCAS was causing students to drop out of high school, and expressed dissatisfaction with the fact that public high school students must pass the MCAS to graduate. Charles Gobron, former superintendent of the Northborough - Southborough Regional School District school district, claimed that the standards set by the MCAS were "unfair", and that the minimum threshold for proficiency on the tests was being raised each year, "making it look like schools are doing worse than they really are." The MCAS has also faced opposition from public school teachers. Some, such as Joan Bonsignore of Easthampton High School, claim that the tests do not accurately demonstrate the skills of students, and that they cause anxiety among the students.

The University of Massachusetts Donahue Institute, a research arm of the University President's Office, wrote in 2001 that the MCAS do not measure school or district performance because 84% of the variation in the scores across schools and districts is due to socioeconomic factors. In other words, as the Donahue Institute reported, "One of the consistent findings of this research is that demography explains most of the variation in test scores from district to district. Results from this year's research are similar to results from last year's work: about 84% of the variation in test results (scores for all of the test-taking students for the nine MCAS tests combined) is explained by demography. That is why Weston and Wayland have high MCAS scores and why Holyoke and Brockton have low MCAS scores. Thus, though demography is not destiny, it sets a strong tendency." In the end, wrote the Donahue Report, the MCAS scores tell more about a district's real estate values than the quality of its schools."

Students tend to joke that MCAS stands for "Massachusetts Child Abuse System".

See also
Concept inventory
Connecticut Academic Performance Test in Connecticut
Florida Comprehensive Assessment Test in Florida
Regents Examinations in New York State
Standardized Testing and Reporting in California 
Texas Assessment of Knowledge and Skills
Washington Assessment of Student Learning in Washington State

References

External links
MCAS Curriculum Frameworks
MCAS Released Test Items
MCAS Test Results
"Measuring Up: A Report on Education Standards and Assessments for Massachusetts" Achieve, Inc.

Comprehensive Assessment System
Standardized tests in the United States